Hughes School is a historic school building near Hamilton, Ohio.

Description and history
Historically a one-room school, the rectangular brick building rests on a stone foundation. The gabled roof has corbeled cornices and the double door entry has a four pane slightly rounded transom. The entry is in a two-story projecting bay that was topped with a bell tower with pyramidal roof. A pair of six over six double hung sash windows flank the door with wooden shutters louvered on top and paneled below. These windows and the door have arched keystone lintels with stone keystones and caps. Brick pilasters divide each side of the building into four bays the rear three have windows which duplicate the windows on the facade. The Hughes School is an example of 19th century one–room schoolhouse architecture. 

The land for the school was given to School District No. 4 by Nicholas Curtis in 1832. Elijah Hughes served as school director for the district at that time and is mentioned in the original deed. The school was built in 1887. It was listed on the National Register of Historic Places on January 2, 1976.

See also
 Historic preservation
 History of education in the United States
 Stonemasonry

References

External links 
 * 

School buildings on the National Register of Historic Places in Ohio
Buildings and structures in Butler County, Ohio
National Register of Historic Places in Butler County, Ohio